Hira Tareen (born 1982) is a Pakistani model and actress. Her appearances include Mohabat Subh Ka Sitara Hai, Goya, Tum Kon Piya, Khuda Mera Bhi Hai, Khaas, Zard Zamano Ka Sawera and Choti Choti Batain. She has also appeared in 2013 film Seedlings.

Personal life 
She is married to actor Ali Safina in 2013, with whom she has one child.

Filmography

Film

Television

References

External links 

1988 births
Living people
Pakistani female models